Hamado Kassi Ouédraogo (born 17 March 1983) is a Burkinabé former professional footballer who played as a midfielder.

Club career
Ouédraogo began his career with ASFA Yennega and was 2003 
transferred to KSC Lokeren. He played five matches for Lokeren.

In the 2003–04 season and joined French side Besançon RC in July 2004. Ouédraogo played for Besançon RC in the Championnat National 28 games, scoring 8 goals. In summer 2005, he signed with CA Bastia. He played 35 matches in two years, scoring 22 goals for Bastia in the Championnat de France amateur, his contract ended in June 2007 and he moved as free agent to AS Beauvais Oise. In his first year with AS Beauvais Oise he played 37 games and scored 18 goals in the Championnat National.

International career
Ouedraogo played in the Burkina Faso national football team and holds thirty-three games and scores eight goals. He was a member of the Burkinabé 2003 FIFA World Youth Championship team in United Arab Emirates.

References

External links
 

1983 births
Living people
Sportspeople from Ouagadougou
Association football midfielders
Burkinabé footballers
Burkina Faso international footballers
Burkinabé expatriate footballers
Belgian Pro League players
Ligue 2 players
Championnat National players
ASFA Yennenga players
K.S.C. Lokeren Oost-Vlaanderen players
Racing Besançon players
SC Bastia players
AS Moulins players
US Orléans players
AS Beauvais Oise players
Expatriate footballers in France
Expatriate footballers in Belgium
Burkinabé expatriate sportspeople in France